Takoby Cofield (born January 22, 1992) is a former Canadian football left tackle. He played college football at Duke and was originally signed as an undrafted free agent by the Washington Redskins. He played two seasons in the Canadian Football League (CFL) with the Saskatchewan Roughriders.

Early life and education
Takoby Cofield was born on January 22, 1992, in Taboro, North Carolina. He went to Taboro High School in North Carolina. He played college football at Duke. While at Duke, he played 42 consecutive games, playing in 3,274 snaps. In his senior season, he was named All-Atlantic Coast Conference. The 310 pound offensive lineman was nicknamed "Big Cat" by his coach.

Professional career
Cofield went undrafted in the 2015 NFL Draft. He signed with the Washington Redskins as an undrafted free agent after the Draft. He did not make the roster but later signed to the practice squad. The next year he did not make the roster and was not signed to the practice squad. Instead, he signed with the Seattle Seahawks. In 2017, he signed with the Oakland Raiders but did not play. In 2018, he signed with the Saskatchewan Roughriders of the Canadian Football League. He played in and started 11 games in his first season in the CFL. He played four games the next season before being sidelined with an injury. He signed a contract extension in 2020. He was placed on the suspended list by the Roughriders on July 3, 2021.

Cofield announced his retirement in the 2021 off-season.

References

External links
Notebook: Takoby Cofield can breathe easy again – riderville.com

1992 births
Living people
Saskatchewan Roughriders players
Duke Blue Devils football players
Players of American football from North Carolina